|}

The Celebration Chase is a Grade One National Hunt steeplechase in Great Britain which is open to horses aged five years or older. It is run at Sandown Park over a distance of about 1 mile 7½ furlongs (1 mile, 7 furlongs and 119 yards, or ), and during its running there are thirteen fences to be jumped. The race is scheduled to take place each year in late April.

History
The event has its origins in 2001, when the Cheltenham Festival was cancelled due to a foot-and-mouth crisis. Replacements for some of the Festival's races were held at Sandown in late April, and the equivalent of the Queen Mother Champion Chase was a Grade 1 event called the Championship Chase.

The following year the race returned as the Queen Elizabeth the Queen Mother Celebration Chase, in memory of the Queen Mother (1900–2002), who frequently attended racing at Sandown. The event was downgraded to Class B level, but it continued to attract high quality chasers. It was promoted to Grade Two status in 2005, and at this point its title was shortened to the Celebration Chase.

The race is currently sponsored by Bet365, and it takes place at a meeting which features both jump and flat races. Other events at this meeting include the Bet365 Gold Cup, the Gordon Richards Stakes and the Sandown Mile. The Celebration Chase was upgraded to Grade One by the British Horseracing Board from its 2014 running.

Records
Most successful horse (3 wins):
 Altior - 2017, 2018, 2019

Leading jockey (4 wins):
 Nico de Boinville - Sprinter Sacre (2016), Altior (2017, 2018, 2019)

Leading trainer (7 wins):
 Paul Nicholls – Cenkos (2002, 2004), Andreas (2008), Twist Magic (2009), Sanctuaire (2012), Greaneteen (2021,2022)

Winners

See also
 Horse racing in Great Britain
 List of British National Hunt races
 Recurring sporting events established in 2001  – this race is included under its original title, Championship Chase.

References

 Racing Post:

 pedigreequery.com – Celebration Chase – Sandown.

National Hunt races in Great Britain
Sandown Park Racecourse
National Hunt chases
Recurring sporting events established in 2001
2001 establishments in England